Dennis Gassner (born October 22, 1948) is an American/Canadian production designer. He is notable for his work on Bugsy, Big Fish, Into the Woods, and Blade Runner 2049, his collaborations with the Coen brothers and Sam Mendes, as well the James Bond films Quantum of Solace, Skyfall, and Spectre, the latter two directed by Mendes. He has been nominated seven times for the Academy Award for Best Production Design, and has won once. Gassner was nominated for the Art Directors Guild Award for Excellence in Production Design for a Contemporary Film for his work on Quantum of Solace, and won for his work on Skyfall.

Filmography

Awards

Academy Awards

British Academy Film Awards

References

External links
Information on Golden Compass Nomination

1948 births
Canadian art directors
Living people
People from Vancouver
Best Art Direction Academy Award winners
Best Production Design BAFTA Award winners
David Douglas High School alumni
University of Oregon alumni
Canadian people of American descent
Canadian production designers